Saint-Jacques is a municipality in the Lanaudière region of Quebec, Canada, part of the Montcalm Regional County Municipality.

Saint-Jacques was founded in 1774 by Acadian settlers from Boston after the Great Upheaval of 1755.

Demographics
Population trend:
 Population in 2021: 4302 (2016 to 2021 population change: 8.3%)
 Population in 2016: 3971 
 Population in 2011: 4021 
 Population in 2006: 3706
 Population in 2001: 3692
 Population total in 1996: 3815
 Saint-Jacques Village: 2261
 Saint-Jacques Parish: 1554
 Population in 1991:
 Saint-Jacques Village: 2251
 Saint-Jacques Parish: 1542

Private dwellings occupied by usual residents: 1892 (total dwellings: 1939)

Mother tongue:
 English as first language: 0.5%
 French as first language: 98.8%
 English and French as first language: 0.4%
 Other as first language: 0.3%

Education

Commission scolaire des Samares operates francophone public schools:
 École de Grand-Pré
 École Saint-Louis-de-France

The Sir Wilfrid Laurier School Board operates anglophone public schools, including:
 Joliette Elementary School in Saint-Charles-Borromée
 Joliette High School in Joliette

References

External links

Incorporated places in Lanaudière
Municipalities in Quebec